Redstar is an unincorporated community in Fayette County, West Virginia, United States. Redstar had a post office with ZIP code 25914, which closed on January 20, 2007.

The community has existed under the name Redstar since at least 1893.

Climate
The climate in this area has mild differences between highs and lows, and there is adequate rainfall year-round.  According to the Köppen Climate Classification system, Redstar has a marine west coast climate, abbreviated "Cfb" on climate maps.

References

Unincorporated communities in Fayette County, West Virginia
Unincorporated communities in West Virginia
Coal towns in West Virginia